Patika may refer to:

Patika, Harju County, village in Rae Parish, Harju County, Estonia
Patika, Lääne-Viru County, village in Tapa Parish, Lääne-Viru County, Estonia
Patika Kusulaka, Indo-Scythian satrap in the northwestern South Asia during the 1st century BCE
Patika or Patehka, tehsil of Muzaffarabad District, Pakistan